The Floriana Young Stars Hockey Club is a club from the town of Floriana.  It is one of the main field hockey clubs in Malta.

The club is affiliated to the Hockey Association of Malta. 

The clubhouse is situated at the Independence Arena, Floriana, a few meters away from the Floriana FC football grounds. From last year 2009 Floriana YoungStars Hockey Club have built their own pitch and the clubhouse is situated beneath it. The pitch is hired out for five-a-side football. This club has a great history, and also won lots of honours!

Floriana Young Stars Hockey Club helps many students expand their talent.

References

Field hockey clubs in Malta
Floriana